Grasmo is a small settlement in eastern Norway, on the border to Sweden. 
Its in the northern part of the village of Setskog in Aurskog-Høland municipality in Akershus County.
It is currently inhabited by 6-7 families.

History 

The first registered settlement on Grasmo, was in the early 17th century, primarily on two farms, Grasmoen and Grasmo Vestre. Grasmo Vestre is the original settlement, and records shows the earliest settlement was as a makeshift summer farm. 
One known veteran of the Scandinavian Seven Years war (1807–14), came from Grasmo and participated in the battle of Skotterud in 1814.
The farms ceased operations in the early 1970s, and the farm areas are now mainly used for horses.

Grasmobanen 

Grasmobanen was a horse-drawn railroad 1460 meter long, that was in operations from 1849-1938, part of the Soot Canal constructed by Engebret Soot. In 1871, over 72.000 logs was transported on the railroad. In 1918, the railroad shifted from being horse-drawn, to a steam-engine pulling the timber-wagons with wires. Already in 1920, the steam engine was replaced with a gasoline engine. The engine is still visible on the high end of the railroad at Tvillingtjern and is protected by the municipality due to its historical value. 
Further protection and restorations is planned with co-operation of Aurskog-Høland municipality and the bordering municipality Eidskog.

External links

Notes

Aurskog-Høland
17th-century establishments in Norway